William Patrick Gray (24 May 1927 – 11 April 2011) was an English professional footballer and manager who made over 500 Football League appearances in a variety of positions for Nottingham Forest, Chelsea, Burnley, Millwall and Leyton Orient. He began his short management career while still a player with Millwall and later managed Brentford and Notts County. Gray was capped by England B at international level.

Club career 
An outside right, Gray began his career with hometown Newcastle & District League club Dinnington Colliery and got his start in league football with Third Division South club Leyton Orient in May 1947. He failed to make an impact at Brisbane Road, but made a surprise transfer to First Division club Chelsea for a nominal fee in March 1949. Gray made 172 appearances and scored 14 goals in just over four seasons at Stamford Bridge, before moving to First Division rivals Burnley for a £16,000 fee in August 1953. He made 130 appearances and scored 32 goals during four seasons at Turf Moor.

At age 30, Gray transferred to top-flight club Nottingham Forest for a £4,500 fee in June 1957. In 1958, manager Billy Walker moved Gray from outside to inside forward and he became the team's playmaker and penalty taker, scoring three penalties in Forest's run to the 1959 FA Cup Final and setting up Tommy Wilson's winning goal in the 2–1 victory in the final over Luton Town. Over time, Gray was moved to left back and proved effective in the position, before departing the City Ground at age 36 in November 1963. In six seasons with Forest, Gray made 228 appearances and scored 35 goals. He moved to Third Division strugglers Millwall as player-manager in November 1963 and after the club's relegation to the Fourth Division at the end of the 1963–64 season, he played a bit-part role as a player in the Lions' immediate return to the Third Division at the first attempt. Gray retired at the end of the 1964–65 season. He made a brief comeback for Brentford Reserves in early 1967.

International career 
Gray won one cap for England B and scored in a 5–0 victory over Switzerland in January 1950.

Managerial career 
Gray took over Third Division strugglers Millwall as player-manager in November 1963 and despite relegation to the Fourth Division, he guided the club to successive promotions during the 1964–65 and 1965–66 seasons. A falling-out with the club's directors led to his departure from The Den in May 1966, after promotion had been secured. With five matches of the 1965–66 season still to play, Gray moved across London to take over as manager of Third Division strugglers Brentford, but failed to save the Bees from relegation to the Fourth Division. He kept the cash-strapped club afloat in mid-table for the majority of the 1966-67 season, before following chairman Jack Dunnett out of Griffin Park to Notts County in March 1967. He remained at Meadow Lane until September 1968.

Coaching and other roles 
After leaving football management in 1968, Gray later worked as a groundsman at Meadow Lane and the City Ground.

Personal life 
Gray was married and had five children. His nephew was John Richardson, whom he managed at Millwall and Brentford. On retirement from football management, Gray ran a grocers on Wollaton Road in Nottingham and he later ran a fish and chip shop in Beeston Rylands.

Career statistics

Player

Manager

Honours

As a player 
Nottingham Forest
 FA Cup: 1958–59

As a manager 
Millwall
 Football League Third Division second-place promotion: 1965–66
 Football League Fourth Division second-place promotion: 1964–65
Brentford
 London Challenge Cup: 1966–67

References

External links

1927 births
2011 deaths
Sportspeople from Ashington
Footballers from Northumberland
English footballers
England B international footballers
English football managers
Association football outside forwards
Leyton Orient F.C. players
Chelsea F.C. players
Burnley F.C. players
Nottingham Forest F.C. players
Millwall F.C. players
Millwall F.C. managers
Brentford F.C. managers
Notts County F.C. managers
English Football League players
English Football League managers
Association football wing halves
Association football fullbacks
Notts County F.C. non-playing staff
Nottingham Forest F.C. non-playing staff
Fulham F.C. non-playing staff
FA Cup Final players